Franz Arzdorf (5 May 1904 – 24 April 1974) was a German stage, film and television actor.

Selected filmography
 Love Can Lie (1937)
 Dangerous Game (1937)
 Talking About Jacqueline (1937)
 A Night in May (1938)
 Men, Animals and Sensations (1938)
 A Girl Goes Ashore (1938)
 People Who Travel (1938)
 Kitty and the World Conference  (1939)
 Escape in the Dark (1939)
 The Merciful Lie (1939)
 The Governor (1939)
 The Three Codonas (1940)
 Counterfeiters (1940)
 Friedemann Bach (1941)
 The Swedish Nightingale (1941)
 The Golden Spider (1943)
 Dark Eyes (1951)
 Mikosch Comes In (1952)
 Mailman Mueller (1953)

References

Bibliography
 Wolfgang Jacobsen & Hans Helmut Prinzler. Käutner. Spiess, 1992.

External links

1904 births
1974 deaths
German male film actors
German male stage actors
German male television actors
Male actors from Munich
20th-century German male actors